Clarke High School  is a public secondary school in Newcastle, Ontario, Canada, within the Kawartha Pine Ridge District School Board. It is the only secondary school in Newcastle, and has three feeder schools: Newcastle Public School, Orono Public School, and The Pines Senior Public School.

See also
List of high schools in Ontario

References

External links
Official Site
KPRDSB Site

High schools in the Regional Municipality of Durham
Buildings and structures in Clarington